Josef Ringel (born 25 January 1965) is a retired Czech football defender.

References

1965 births
Living people
Czech footballers
FC Hradec Králové players
AFK Atlantic Lázně Bohdaneč players
MFK Chrudim players
SC Xaverov players
Czechoslovak First League players
Czech First League players
Association football defenders